The Economic and Political Weekly (EPW) is a weekly peer-reviewed academic journal covering all social sciences, and is published by the Sameeksha Trust. In January 2018, academic Gopal Guru was named the new Editor of the journal. Guru will be Editor for a period of five years. The previous full-time editor was Paranjoy Guha Thakurta. The Trust had earlier appointed Guha Thakurta as the new editor of the journal with effect from 1 April 2016. His appointment came at a time when many social scientists were opposing the supposed removal of the previous editor C. Rammanohar Reddy, who resigned in January 2016 only to controversially end in 2017 with Guha Thakurta also resigning.

Gopal Guru is currently at the Centre for Political Studies at the Jawaharlal Nehru University in New Delhi, and is Editor-designate of the journal. The Sameeksha Trust board comprises eminent persons from academia and business, namely, Deepak Nayyar (Chairman), D N Ghosh (Managing Trustee), Andre Beteille, Deepak Parekh, Romila Thapar, Rajeev Bhargava , Dipankar Gupta, and Shyam Menon.

History 
The journal was established in 1949 as the Economic Weekly and edited by Sachin Chaudhuri. It obtained its current name in 1966. It was edited by Krishna Raj for more than three decades and is among the most prestigious scholarly journals in India, having had contributions from many of the country's best known scholars.

Past authors include Amartya Sen, Manmohan Singh, Jagdish Bhagwati, Ramachandra Guha, Angus Deaton, Kaushik Basu, Romila Thapar, Jeffrey Sachs, Prannoy Roy, T.N. Srinivasan, Subramanian Swamy, Christophe Jaffrelot, Jean Drèze, Mani Shankar Aiyar, Andre Beteille, Ashok Gulati, and Nirupam Bajpai.

Political position 
The journal is known for its strong editorial stance with a "social conscience" and for taking left-leaning positions in its editorials, which were occasionally critical of the Communist Party of India (Marxist) government in West Bengal for not being radical enough. The journal was harshly critical of some of the policies of the Indira Gandhi government during the Emergency, as well as of state complicity in the 2002 Gujarat riots.

Abstracting and indexing 
The journal is abstracted and indexed in CAB Abstracts and Scopus.

Licensing 
EPW has licensed its material for non-exclusive use to 3 content aggregators - Contify, Factiva and JSTOR.

Contify disseminates EPW content to LexisNexis, Thomson Reuters, Securities.com, Gale Cengage, AcquireMedia and NewsBank.

Factiva and JSTOR have EPW content on their databases for their registered users.

Controversy 
In 2016, C. Rammanohar Reddy quit as editor in a controversial move which led to several academics expressing concern in an open letter, and at least one board member, Jean Dreze, resigning from the board. Shortly after, his successor Paranjoy Guha Thakurta also quit in 2017 after a controversial article about the Adani Group was removed from the website amidst reasons that many felt were unclear or unjustified. In its defence, the Trust posted a statement on the EPW website stating that Guha Thakurta had violated his position by responding to a legal notice sent by the Adani Group without informing the Trust. This once again led to various scholars and commentators questioning the Sameeksha Trust that runs the journal.

Eventually professor and scholar Gopal Guru was appointed as the new editor in January 2018.

References

External links 
 

Weekly journals
Publications established in 1949
1949 establishments in India
English-language journals
Multidisciplinary social science journals
Academic journals published in India